Dumfries is a Scottish town.

Dumfries may also refer to:

 Dumfries Burghs (UK Parliament constituency) (1708–1918)
 Dumfriesshire (UK Parliament constituency) (1708–2005), known from 1950 to 2005 as Dumfries
 Dumfries Parish, New Brunswick, Canada
 Dumfries, New Brunswick, an unincorporated community therein
 Dumfries, Virginia, United States, a town
 Denzel Dumfries (born 1996), Dutch footballer

See also